The Chrysler ETV-1 was a passenger car produced by Chrysler as a test bed for motor and drive controls.  With a motor produced by General Electric, it was claimed to be the "first ground up modern day electric vehicle design."

Specifications

Powertrain
The ETV-1 uses one  electric motor, front-mounted driving the front axle.

Battery
ETV-1 utilises a removable 'T' shaped battery pack, The Battery pack has a total capacity of  electric vehicle battery.

References

Chrysler
Electric cars
Electric vehicles
ETV-1